The Kingdom of Hejaz and Nejd, initially the Kingdom of Hejaz and Sultanate of Nejd (Arabic:), was a dual monarchy ruled by Abdulaziz following the victory of the Saudi Sultanate of Nejd over the Hashemite Kingdom of the Hejaz in 1925. It was the fourth iteration of the Third Saudi State.

In 1932, the two kingdoms were unified as the Kingdom of Saudi Arabia.

History
On 8 January 1926, Abdulaziz, the Sultan of Nejd, was crowned King of the Hejaz in the Masjid al-Haram in Makkah, and he elevated Nejd to the status of a kingdom on 29 January 1927. At the Treaty of Jeddah on 20 May 1927, Abdulaziz's realm was recognised by the United Kingdom of Great Britain and Northern Ireland, and was addressed as the Kingdom of Hejaz and Nejd.

For the next five years, Abdulaziz administered the two parts of his dual kingdom as separate units. On 23 September 1932, Abdulaziz proclaimed the union of the main Saudi dominions of al-Hasa, Qatif, Nejd and the Hejaz as the Kingdom of Saudi Arabia.

Foreign policy
The Kingdom of Hejaz and Nejd could pursue its expansionist policy by British arms supplies because of its close relations with the United Kingdom. Under King Abdulaziz, the Hejaz withdrew from the League of Nations.

In 1926, the Kingdom of Hejaz and Nejd was recognised by the Union of Soviet Socialist Republics, followed by the United States of America in 1931. By 1932, the United Kingdom, the French Third Republic, the USSR, Turkey, the Imperial State of Iran, Kingdom of Italy and The Netherlands maintained legations in Jeddah; The Kingdom of Egypt maintained unofficial consular representatives.

Rulers of Hejaz and Nejd

King of Hejaz and Nejd (1926–1932)

Viceroy of Hejaz (1926–1932)

Viceroy of Nejd (1926–1932)

Notes

Sources
 Statoids - Regions of Saudi Arabia
 World Statesmen - Saudi Arabia

External links

Former Arab states
History of Hejaz
History of Nejd
History of Saudi Arabia
Hejaz and Nejd
Najd
1920s in Saudi Arabia
1930s in Saudi Arabia
States and territories established in 1926
States and territories disestablished in 1932
1926 establishments in Asia
1932 disestablishments in Asia
Former countries of the interwar period
Former kingdoms